Jagdish Shumsher Rana (1929 – 2017) was a Nepalese writer and politician. In 1981, Rana was awarded the Madan Puraskar.

Biography 
Jagdish Shumsher Rana was born on August 3, 1929 (Bhadra 3, 1986 BS) in Kathmandu, Nepal to Mrigendra Shumsher Rana. His grandfather was Baber Shumsher Jung Bahadur Rana, son of Chandra Shumsher Jung Bahadur Rana. 

In 1960, he moved to Shimla after the rise of Panchayat in Nepal. On 16 July 1965, he married Bhuveneshwari Kumari. 

In 1981, Rana was awarded the Madan Puraskar for Narsingh Awatar. He served as ambassador of Nepal to India from 1983 to 1988. 

Rana died on 9 October 2017 due to heart failure.

Works 

 Narsingh Awatar
 Seto Khyak
 Uttar Aadhunikta ra Bahulya Bisfot
 Dash Dristikon

References 

1929 births
2017 deaths
20th-century Nepalese writers
Ambassadors of Nepal to India
Madan Puraskar winners
Nepalese male writers
People from Kathmandu
Rana dynasty